is a fictional boss character from the Darkstalkers fighting game franchise by Capcom. Serving as the main antagonist of the 1997 third installment of the series, Darkstalkers 3 (Vampire Savior: The Lord of Vampire in Japan), he seeks to restore order to the demon dimension of Makai through extreme measures after it falls into chaos, thus setting up the events of the third tournament in the Darkstalkers storyline. 

The first explicitly graphic character in the series, Jedah has appeared on Darkstalkers merchandise and in alternate media in addition to several Capcom crossover games. He has received positive critical reception for his gameplay, characterization and design.

Appearances

Darkstalkers series
Making his series debut in Darkstalkers 3, Jedah Dohma is a shrewd and well-spoken nobleman of his home dimension of Makai. Fearing that the demonic realm would fall into ruin if it continued under the reign of Belial Aensland (Morrigan's father), he awaited the perfect opportunity to assassinate him. After Belial's death, Jedah enlists a confidant, Ozom (a minor character introduced in Night Warriors: Darkstalkers' Revenge), as a soul-eater. However, Ozom devises a scheme to steal the rule of the Dohma estate for himself, which involves tricking Jedah into opening a magical gate in order to gain access to the imprisoned souls therein and absorb their power. As expected, the unleashed souls overwhelm Jedah and kill him, and Ozom takes over his rule. After his resurrection a century later, Jedah discovers that Makai has descended into madness and infighting, and plans to rebuild the beleaguered realm from scratch by collecting souls that he plans to fuse into a singular sentient being. This results in the conception of a new pocket dimension called Majigen, whose foundation is formed by Ozom's soul after Jedah convinces him to surrender it. Jedah then proceeds to lure all those whom he feels possess worthy souls—the Darkstalkers themselves—into the dimension, which sets up the events of the third game. The saga concludes with Demitri Maximoff temporarily halting his longtime feud with Morrigan in order to engage his nemesis Jedah in final battle over Makai's rule.

As the centerpiece of the Darkstalkers 3 plot, Jedah plays a part in other characters' in-game storylines, such as his causing the disappearance of Sasquatch's fellow bigfoot, Victor voluntarily entering Majigen in hopes of reviving his sister Emily, and Rikuo doing likewise to search for his missing son. He is additionally responsible for the creation of Morrigan's "sister" Lilith, who was spawned from a segment of power that had previously been split from Morrigan by Belial, and then stolen and crafted by Jedah into a smaller, younger clone of Morrigan. Meanwhile, Q-Bee and her carnivorous Makaian species of "Soul Bees", who had long inhabited land on the Dohma estate, are faced with extinction following Jedah's death and the lengthy period prior to his resurrection.

Other video games
Jedah joined fellow Darkstalkers characters Anakaris, Demitri and Felicia  in the 2004 Capcom fighting crossover Capcom Fighting Evolution, and made a playable appearance in the tactical role-playing games Cross Edge (2008) and an unplayable appearance in Project X Zone (2012). In the 2017 crossover fighter Marvel vs. Capcom: Infinite, Jedah is a playable character and major antagonist. He proposes an alliance with Death to merge their two worlds and create equilibrium between life and death. When Ultron Sigma betrays them, Jedah uses the Soul Stone to feed souls to a Symbiote, hoping to use it as a weapon. The Symbiote is ultimately defeated by the heroes, and Dante defeats Jedah in combat and takes the Soul Stone. Jedah later tells Death he has another plan, but the two are attacked by a vengeful Thanos.

Design
Jedah appears in all Capcom media as a tall, handsome, blue-skinned humanoid figure dressed head to toe in purple, notably a high-collared, calf-length coat with large circular gold buttons down the front, and accented with symmetrical red stripes on the shoulders that are actually seeping self-inflicted open wounds. He sports a winged headdress that reveals several strands of long blond hair, and attached to his back are lifesized scythed wings that are used as weapons and for flight. He is canonically listed as standing 7'1" in height, while his weight varies from 26 to over 2,200 pounds.

During preproduction of Darkstalkers 3, Jedah was initially named "Belial Jr.", as he was intended to be a descendant of Belial and therefore Morrigan's brother. The development title of the North American release of the game was Jedah's Damnation. Like Baby Bonnie Hood, another then-newcomer to the series, Jedah is a series playable who was not modeled after a horror or mythological archetype; instead, he was designed as a combination of a Japanese schoolboy (his outfit resembles a gakuran) and the personification of Death, leading to his being described as a "Grim Reaper/Satan hybrid figure." He regularly has at least one hand in his pocket whether in attack or idle mode, and he glides across the playfield instead of walking. In Capcom Fighting Evolution, Jedah was one of several playable characters whose old sprites were recycled for the game, which was criticized as a lack of effort on Capcom's part. He gained new two-dimensional sprites for Project X Zone and Cross Edge.

"Jedah" is not a recognized first name, and is a possible shortening by Capcom of the name Jedediah ("friend of God" in Hebrew), given the character's religious overtones.

Gameplay
Jedah's offensive arsenal features a level of graphic violence previously unseen in the otherwise comedic atmosphere of the Darkstalkers games. He uses no traditional punches or kicks; instead, his special moves (which have Italian names, in allusion to Dante's Inferno) involve self-mutilation. He uses his own blood as a weapon in conjunction with him beheading himself, ripping his hands from his arms to strike opponents at a distance, or extending from his fingertips long claws composed entirely of blood, with his appendages promptly regenerating each time. His "Finale Rosso" super move features opposing players being forcefully submerged into a deep pool of blood and then pummeled by a series of disembodied hands. His personalized stage in the game's final boss fight is the cavernous interior of an alien uterus that contains phallic imagery and a demonic humanoid fetus (named the "Fetus of God") with an exposed brain. When players are victorious, the background shakes as the fetus's eyes widen and its body begins spasming. Capcom producer Derek Neal called the stage "possibly the most disturbing thing" in the Darkstalkers series.

According to GamesRadar, "his blood-magic super-moves make him best suited to offensive play" in Darkstalkers 3. GameFan wrote in 1997 that "Jedah's overall strategy is to suppress his opponent's aggressive tendencies", but his weaknesses included "difficulty against aggressive opponents when [up] close" and limited options in knocking down opponents. Matt Yeo of Sega Saturn Magazine opined that with his "spinning blades and superior speed", Jedah was "only for the more advanced players. ... 
his timing and moves are hard to master".

Joe Dodson of Game Revolution described Jedah's fighting style in Capcom Fighting Evolution as "highly mobile and has several ranged attacks that can pin down opponents. ... He can be a real tough nut to crack for some of the old Street Fighter guys".

Other media 

Jedah joined the other series characters in multiple Darkstalkers 3 art and guide mooks written by the staff of Japanese magazine Gamest and published by Shinseisha. In Mayumi Azuma's 1997 manga Vampire Savior: Tamashii no Mayoigo, which focuses on the Darkstalkers 3 storyline, Jedah is the main antagonist who observes the machinations of the other series characters from the confines of his castle. His connection to Lilith (the comic's main character) is explored in depth, while Q-Bee serves as his second-in-command, addressing him as Jedah-sama and assisting him in luring the Darkstalkers into Majigen.<ref>Vampire Savior: Tamashii no Mayoigo #5—Gangan Comics</ref> In the 1997 manga Darkstalkers/Red Earth: Maleficarum (translated and rereleased in 2010 by Udon Entertainment), he is in three of the book's five Darkstalkers chapters, first seen interrupting a brawl between Morrigan and Demitri. In Udon's three-volume 2010 Darkstalkers: Night Warriors miniseries, Jedah makes a one-page appearance with Lilith at the conclusion of the final issue that ends in an unresolved cliffhanger. Despite Jedah's omission from the series, Night Warriors artists Eric Vedder and Joe Vriens expressed their admiration for the character.

Promotion and merchandise
Capcom promoted Jedah as a new face of the Darkstalkers franchise prior to the game's May 1997 release, prominently displaying the character on an advertising flyer distributed to arcades in Europe. The company additionally ribbed the rejected Jedah's Damnation title in a Darkstalkers 3 edition of their "Secret File" booklet series, with its front and back covers designed as a mockup of a VHS case for a fictional B movie titled Demon's Damnation.

Jedah was featured on a collectible limited-edition Zippo lighter released by Capcom in 1998, which was engraved with his likeness and the Vampire Savior logo. He received his own action figure the following year as part of Capcom's  "Action Hero Real Series", made available in "purple" and "black" variations. SOTA Toys displayed an unfinished Jedah prototype at the 2006 San Diego Comic-Con, but the figure was never produced. Other figures were available only in Japan, such as one produced by Yujin in 2001, and a 7.8" resin statuette from Clayz. The character has additionally appeared in various Darkstalkers art compilations published by Udon Entertainment, such as Darkstalkers Graphic File, Darkstalkers Tribute, and Darkstalkers Official Complete Works, as well as the 2014 collectible card game Universal Fighting System by Jasco Games. 

Reception

The character has met with positive reception from various gaming media publications. Jedah was ranked fifth in Gamest's "top 50" list of the best video game characters in their December 1997 issue, tying with Street Fighter's Dan Hibiki. Sega Saturn Magazine deemed him "the ultimate Darkstalker". Yas Hunter of Computer and Video Games magazine raved in their August 1997 issue, "The best character ever? Most definitely!" and called his specials "some of the best-looking in ... any fighting game". Patrick Roesle of Hardcore Gaming 101 enthused: "It's hard to find a place to begin describing how cool Jedah is ... [he] kicks ass. He's the bloody Antichrist, for Pete's sake". Rare Gamer described him as "intimidating" and among "the most creative [character] designs that Capcom’s ever put out". ScrewAttack said in 2013: "Aside from the Joker can you think of anybody else that can make a purple suit look so badass?" Topless Robot placed him third in their 2013 selection of the ten "most diabolical" video game bosses, while remarking: "Killer fashion sense and killer blood. Jedah is the full package, ladies". Game Revolution said of the impending release of Darkstalkers Resurrection in 2013: "With any luck, this package will make a new set of fans fall in love with Demitri, Talbain, Jedah, and company". James Dewitt of Thunderbolt Games said of "vampire priest" Jedah's machinations in Darkstalkers 3: "Somehow this will save the demon dimension, and in typical fighting game fashion the overall plot collapses under the weight of its sheer convolution". Jedah was coolly received in a 2002 fan-voted favorite-character poll hosted by GameFAQs, in which he was ranked tenth out of the series' eighteen playables.

The "Fetus of God" background from Darkstalkers 3 has received attention for its graphic content. Rich Knight of Complex cited it in including Jedah among their "15 Coolest Boss Battles Ever" in 2012: "Half the fun of having a great final boss fight is how the level looks that you're fighting in. Jedah has that on lock". It was included in VentureBeat's 2012 feature on memorable video-game babies. Modojo.com described Jedah as "a pushover, but his [stage] background is pretty amazing". Machinima.com simultaneously rated it second-best and second-worst in their 2011 selection of the "Seven Best and Worst Fighting Game Stages", both times for its perceived creepiness factor. Maxwell Coviello of Pixelitis rated it among his selection of the ten "strangest fighting game stages" in 2014, calling it "one of the most graphically disturbing stages in fighting game history". David Houghton of GamesRadar included the "nightmarishly vile" stage in a feature the same year on "the 27 most amazing fighting game backgrounds".

Arcade Sushi ranked his "Finale Rosso" special thirteenth in their 2013 selection of the fifteen "greatest" fighting-game super moves: "Imagine getting pulled into the Underworld, a blood-filled miasma of terror and pain, and getting mauled on all sides while a psychotic monster stands mere feet from you, laughing at your torment". Jedah's Capcom Fighting Evolution ending, in which Devil May Cry character Dante sneaks up on him from behind while he revels in the destruction of Earth, was ranked 126th in 4thletter's 2013 selection of the top 200 fighting game endings: "Jedah takes a second to laugh maniacally at his handiwork. He might not be laughing in five seconds". Complex selected him as the Darkstalkers representative in pitching a fantasy crossover fighting game versus the cast of Guilty Gear'': "All the horror movie archetypes and whatever the hell Faust is would look sweet doing battle against each other with heavy metal playing in the background".

See also
List of Darkstalkers characters

Notes

References

Capcom antagonists
Darkstalkers characters
Demon characters in video games
Extraterrestrial characters in video games
Male characters in video games
Male video game villains
Shapeshifter characters in video games
Telepath characters in video games
Undead characters in video games
Video game bosses
Video game characters introduced in 1997
Video game characters who can teleport
Video game characters who use magic
Video game characters with accelerated healing
Nobility characters in video games